The Chicago Mercantile Exchange Hurricane Index (CMEHI) is an index which describes the potential for damage from an Atlantic hurricane in the United States. The CMEHI is used as the basis for trading hurricane futures and options on the Chicago Mercantile Exchange (CME). It is very similar to the Hurricane Severity Index, which also factors both size and intensity of a hurricane.

Index calculation 
The CMEHI takes as input two variables: the maximum sustained wind speed of a hurricane in miles per hour and the radius to hurricane-force winds of a hurricane in miles (i.e. how far from the center of the hurricane winds of 74 mph or greater are experienced). If the maximum sustained wind speed is denoted by V and the radius to hurricane-force winds is denoted by R then the CMEHI is calculated as follows:

where the subscript 0 denotes reference values. For use on the CME, the reference values of 74 mph and 60 miles are used for the maximum sustained wind speed and radius of hurricane-force winds respectively.

Index history and data 
The development of the CMEHI was based on work published by Lakshmi Kantha at the Department of Aerospace Studies at the University of Colorado in Boulder, Colorado. Kantha's paper in Eos developed a number of indices based on various characteristics of hurricanes. The ReAdvisory team at the reinsurance broker RK Carvill used the basics of the Kantha paper to develop an index which became the Carvill Hurricane Index (CHI). In 2009, the scale was renamed the Chicago Mercantile Exchange Hurricane Index (CMEHI).

The data for the CMEHI comes from the public advisories issued for named storms by the National Hurricane Center. Specifically, to determine the maximum sustained wind speed, the following verbiage is looked for:

To determine the radius to hurricane-force winds, the following phrase is looked for:

For example, Advisory 23A for Hurricane Katrina at 1pm Central daylight time on Sunday, August 28, 2005, gave the maximum sustained wind speed of 175 mph and the radius of hurricane-force winds of 105 miles resulting in a CMEHI value of 27.9.

Data 
Public advisories from the National Hurricane Center are archived back to 1998. The table below lists the CMEHI values for all the landfalling hurricanes since 1998 based on the NHC Public Advisories, and uses alternate sources for hurricanes between 1989 and 1998.

Prior to 1998, the data becomes sparse. However, using data from the HURSAT database at NOAA it is possible to construct a set of CMEHI values for storms back to 1983.

Modeled data is available from a number of sources:
 Seasonal data, suitable for use in the insurance and reinsurance community, is provided by AIR Worldwide
 Atmospheric and Environmental Research, Inc. provide CMEHI values for live storms through their hCast-SR product
 MDA Federal provide a real-time CMEHI forecasting product

Notes 

Wind
Atlantic hurricanes
Tropical cyclone meteorology
Hazard scales